Henry Jules Joseph Pierre Soum (29 December 1899 – 24 August 1983) was a préfet of the Doubs (27 March 1943 – 17 November 1944) then Minister of State for Monaco. He served between 1953 and 1959. He was born in 1899 and died in 1983.

References

Ministers of State of Monaco
1899 births
1983 deaths